There were four Austin cars to use the Seven name:
 The 1909–1911 Austin 7 hp 
 The 1922–1939 Austin 7
 The launch title of the Austin A30
 The original Mini

The name Austin Seven was also used to refer to the LMS Class 7F 0-8-0 engines.

The name Seven will be brought back by Mini for a visual package on the existing 3-door and 5-door Mini Cooper and Cooper S worldwide from July 2016.

Seven